Little Cypress-Mauriceville Consolidated Independent School District is a public school district located in northeastern Orange County, Texas (USA).

The district serves the communities of Little Cypress and Mauriceville.

In 2009, the school district was rated "academically unacceptable" by the Texas Education Agency.

In 2017 LCM High was affected by flooding when Hurricane Harvey hit Orange, Texas.

Schools
Little Cypress-Mauriceville High (Grades 9-12)
Little Cypress Junior High (Grades 6-8)
Mauriceville Middle (Grades 6-8)
Little Cypress Intermediate (Grades 4-5)
Little Cypress Elementary (Grades PK-3)
Mauriceville Elementary (Grades PK-5)

References

External links
Little Cypress-Mauriceville Consolidated ISD

School districts in Orange County, Texas